Nergundi Junction railway station is a railway station on the East Coast Railway network in the state of Odisha, India. It serves Nergundi town. Its code is NRG. It has three platforms. Passenger, MEMU, Express trains halt at Nergundi Junction railway station.

Major trains

 Howrah–Puri Express

See also
 Cuttack district

References

Railway stations in Cuttack district
Khurda Road railway division